Odd Kirkeby (3 April 1925 – 26 December 2009) was a Norwegian politician for the Conservative Party.

He was born in Vang, Hedmark as a son of a shopowner. Following a mercantile education Odd Kirkeby was himself a shopowner his entire career. He entered politics after the Second World War and chaired the Young Conservatives in Hamar from 1946 to 1949, and in Hedmark from 1950–52 and 1954–56. He quickly advanced to chairman of the Conservative Party in Hamar from 1950–52 and 1958–60, and in Hedmark from 1967 to 1971.

Kirkeby was an elected member of Hamar city council's executive committee from 1955 to 1975 and Hedmark county council from 1963 to 1991. He then embarked on three more terms in Hamar city council, 1991 to 2003. He served as a deputy representative to the Parliament of Norway from Hedmark during the terms 1961–1965, 1969–1973 and 1973–1977. In total he met during 152 days of parliamentary session.

Outside of politics he was a board member of local energy companies from 1972 to 1999, with certain hiatuses. He died in 2009, aged 86.

References

1925 births
2009 deaths
Politicians from Hamar
Hedmark politicians
Conservative Party (Norway) politicians
Deputy members of the Storting